Neath Port Talbot Hospital is a general hospital located in Port Talbot, Wales. It is managed by Swansea Bay University Health Board.

History
The hospital, which was commissioned to replace Neath General Hospital and Port Talbot General Hospital, was procured under a Private Finance Initiative contract in May 2000. It was designed by SSL and built by Kier Group at a cost of £56 million; it was officially opened by the Prince of Wales on 3 February 2003.

In September 2012 the Health Board announced significant investment to create a new specialist IVF unit and expand the urology unit at the hospital in a bid to recruit and retain experienced clinicians.

Performance
In May 2014 staff at the hospital was criticised in a report into the death of an elderly patient who had been treated at the hospital; the report found that there had been "variable or poor professional behaviour and practice in the care of frail older people".

References

External links 
 
 Healthcare Inspectorate Wales inspection reports

Hospital buildings completed in 2003
Buildings and structures in Port Talbot
NHS hospitals in Wales
Hospitals established in 2003
2003 establishments in Wales
Hospitals in Neath Port Talbot
Swansea Bay University Health Board